The Cruisers Rock Combo was a British rock band of the early 1960s. Formed in Addlestone, Surrey in 1960, their original line-up comprised singers Tony Gallagher, Kenny King and Chris Wing, backed by Mick Dunford (lead guitar), John Hawken (piano), Pete Harris (bass), and Dave Maine (drums). The singers departed at around the same time that neighbouring band The Nashville Teens split; the remaining Cruisers joined the Teens' singers Ray Phillips and Arthur Sharp to form the Mark Two version of The Nashville Teens.

English rock music groups
Musical groups established in 1960
1960 establishments in England